Palace Guard is an American crime drama television series that was briefly broadcast by CBS from October 18 to November 1, 1991, as part of its 1991 fall lineup. It was produced by Stephen J. Cannell.

Synopsis
Palace Guard is the story of a reformed jewel thief and cat burglar, Tommy Logan (D. W. Moffett), who, after serving three years in prison, is released on parole and accepts an offer to become the head of security for the posh Palace Hotel chain. There are two reasons for this somewhat unusual job offer: Logan had previously enjoyed great success in stealing from the high-class clientele of the Palace chain, and so it was thought that he would understand how to prevent others from doing so; and Tommy was the illegitimate son of the chain's owner, Arturo Taft (Tony Lo Bianco), though Taft did not reveal this to Logan. The show centers primarily around the working relationship between Logan and his new boss, Christy Cooper (Marcy Walker), the hotel chain's Vice-President of Public Relations. In each episode, Logan and Cooper travel to a hotel in a different city where Logan helps avert some disaster using quirky and questionable methods, leaving Cooper to sweep up the fallout.

Cast
D. W. Moffett as Tommy Logan
Tony Lo Bianco as Arturo Taft
Marcy Walker as Christy Cooper

Episodes

Broadcast
Palace Guard was broadcast by CBS from October 18 to November 1, 1991. Counting the show's feature-length pilot, only three of the eight completed episodes of Palace Guard were aired on CBS.

Home media
In July 2010, Mill Creek Entertainment released Prime Time Crime: The Stephen J. Cannell Collection on DVD in Region 1. This special collection contained 54 episodes from 13 different shows produced by Stephen J. Cannell Productions including all eight episodes of Palace Guard.

References

External links
 
 

CBS original programming
1991 American television series debuts
1991 American television series endings
Television series by 20th Century Fox Television
Television series by Stephen J. Cannell Productions
Television shows filmed in Vancouver